The Armed Forces Museum is a military history museum located in Kumasi, Ghana. It was established in 1953.

References

See also 
 List of museums in Ghana

Museums in Ghana
Museums established in 1953
1953 establishments in Gold Coast (British colony)
Buildings and structures in Kumasi